One Hamlet Less is a 1973 Italian drama film directed by Carmelo Bene. It was entered into the 1973 Cannes Film Festival.

Plot
Carmelo Bene is the director of a theater company that runs around various theaters in Europe, staging William Shakespeare's Hamlet. He himself also appears in real life to behave as the Prince of Denmark disinherited by his uncle and the whole of society; so immediately these situations merge with the actual plot of Shakespeare's work. Hamlet becomes an inept and becomes aware of it, although he manages to recover his throne usurped by the cruel uncle Claudio who killed his father. Kate is the only reason for life for Hamlet who, after her untimely death, celebrates her a curious funeral, declaring to the grave that she did well to die, not to exist thanks to his help.

Cast
 Carmelo Bene as Hamlet
 Luciana Cante as Gertrude
 Sergio Di Giulio as William
 Franco Leo as Horatio
 Lydia Mancinelli as Kate
 Luigi Mezzanotte as Laertes
 Isabella Russo as Ophelia
 Giuseppe Tuminelli as Polonius
 Alfiero Vincenti as Claudius

References

External links

1973 films
1973 drama films
Italian drama films
1970s Italian-language films
Films directed by Carmelo Bene
Films based on Hamlet
1970s Italian films